Max Galpin (27 July 1935 – 18 August 2015) was an Australian rules footballer who played with Fitzroy in the Victorian Football League (VFL).

Notes

External links 		
		
		
		
		
2015 deaths	
1935 births		
Australian rules footballers from Victoria (Australia)		
Fitzroy Football Club players